Dallas & Robo is an American adult animation comedy streaming television series created by Mike Roberts and starring John Cena and Kat Dennings that premiered on May 30, 2018 on YouTube Premium.

The series began airing on Syfy's late-night programming block TZGZ on August 8, 2020.

Premise
Dallas & Robo follows "sassy space-trucker Dallas and self-proclaimed warrior-poet robot Robo who must navigate their way around cannibal bikers, rival space truckers, and vending machine burritos as they try to make a buck in the seedy world of interplanetary big-rigging."

Cast and characters

Main

 John Cena as Robo
 Kat Dennings as Dallas Moonshiner
 Stephen Root as Uncle Danny Moonshiner
 Tim Blake Nelson as The Woodsman
 Milana Vayntrub as Ellie Moonshiner
 Dana Snyder as Fat Paul

Recurring
 Julie Nathanson as Computer
 Giancarlo Esposito as Victor Goldsmith
 Clancy Brown as The Stranger
 Taran Killam as Bright Eyes
 Jane Lynch as Carol
 Steve Little as Freddy Calhoun
 Bree Williamson as Hellen
 Nat Faxon as Clark

Guest
 Matt Braunger as Blood Tooth ("Aces Wild")
 Charlyne Yi as Amber ("Moonbound and Down")
 David Hornsby as Dirt Ripper ("Murder on the Georgia Overdrive"), a murderer hiding aboard the "Georgia Overdrive" that assumes the identity of the ship's intern, Skip, after killing him.
 Tom Lennon as Dr. John Eichler and Dicky St. James ("Murder on the Georgia Overdrive")
 Dale Watson as The Balladeer ("Murder on the Georgia Overdrive")
 Suzanne Keilly as Dr. Gretta Bunson ("Murder on the Georgia Overdrive")
 Ted Raimi as Bruce Stoneman and Dr. Emanuel Gardner ("Murder on the Georgia Overdrive")
 Eric Bauza as Whiskey Johnson and Bill Dickman ("Le Mars")
 Dave Dameshek as Gene Leondowski ("Le Mars")
 Jeffrey DeMunn as Charlie ("I Was a Teenage Cannibal Biker")
 Ethan Phillips as Bob ("I Was a Teenage Cannibal Biker")
 Bob Bergen as Grizzled Trucker ("I Was a Teenage Cannibal Biker")

Episodes

Production

Development
On August 4, 2017, it was announced that YouTube had given the production a series order for a first season consisting of eight half-hour episodes. The series was created by Mike Roberts and is set to be written by Matt Mariska and Andy Sipes. Executive producers are set to include Roberts, Mariska, Sipes, and John Cena. Production company and animation studio ShadowMachine, which has produced animated series including Robot Chicken and BoJack Horseman, produced the series.

Casting
Alongside the initial series announcement, it was reported that John Cena and Kat Dennings were cast in the series' lead roles of Robo and Dallas, respectively. The main cast is also set to be rounded out by Jane Lynch, Dana Snyder, Giancarlo Esposito, Clancy Brown, Bree Williamson, Nat Faxon, Taran Killam, and Milana Vayntrub.

Release

Marketing
On May 4, 2018, YouTube Red released a series of promotional images from the series and announced that it would premiere on May 30, 2018. On May 18, 2018, the first trailer for the series was released.

Reception
In a positive review, Forbes Merrill Barr praised the series saying, "Dallas & Robo is something special and different while still feeling familiar and safe. It’s the Fast & Furious to Futuramas Point Break. A heavily Groening inspired series that completely surprises in its competency, complexity and charm. It is absolutely must-see television and one of the top three series on YouTube Premium".

References

External links

2010s American adult animated television series
2018 American television series debuts
American adult animated comedy television series
English-language television shows
Television series set in the 23rd century
YouTube Premium original series